{{DISPLAYTITLE:5-HT2 receptor}}
The 5-HT2 receptors are a subfamily of 5-HT receptors that bind the endogenous neurotransmitter serotonin (5-hydroxytryptamine, 5-HT). The 5-HT2 subfamily consists of three G protein-coupled receptors (GPCRs) which are coupled to Gq/G11 and mediate excitatory neurotransmission, including 5-HT2A, 5-HT2B, and 5-HT2C. For more information, please see the respective main articles of the individual subtypes:

 5-HT2A receptor
 5-HT2B receptor
 5-HT2C receptor

See also
 5-HT1 receptor
 5-HT3 receptor
 5-HT4 receptor
 5-HT5 receptor
 5-HT6 receptor
 5-HT7 receptor
 Category:5-HT2 antagonists

References

Serotonin receptors